Karachi riots may refer to:

12 May Karachi riots, in 2007
2010 Karachi riots